Charles Faucette, Jr.  (born October 7, 1963) is a former American football linebacker and former St. Louis Rams strength and conditioning coach. He played two seasons for the San Diego Chargers, appearing in ten games. Faucette attended the University of Maryland, College Park from 1983 to 1986 and left as the Terrapins second-leading all-time tackler with 466, behind only Eric Wilson (481). , Faucette still ranks third on Maryland's all-time list, only behind Wilson and D'Qwell Jackson (473).  He is currently the Head Football Coach at Ida S. Baker High School in Cape Coral, Florida.

Raised in Willingboro Township, New Jersey, Faucette played both baseball and football at Willingboro High School.

Faucette helped the Terrapins to three-straight Atlantic Coast Conference championships (1983–85), serving as team captain in his senior year. He was a two-time All-ACC selection and a three-time honorable mention All-American. However, due to the unusual college defense in which he played, a wide-tackle-six, pro teams were not sure how he would fit into their more standard 3-4 or 4-3 defenses. He was drafted in the tenth round of the 1987 NFL Draft by the New York Giants.

After two seasons with the Chargers, he retired from the NFL after he suffered a broken neck, and started his coaching career as the head coach at Crawford High School in San Diego in 1990. Faucette went on to coach the linebackers for the Hamilton Tiger-Cats of the Canadian Football League from 1990 to 1992, alongside serving as the team's head strength coach. Between 1996 and 1999, he served as the boys' athletic director and head football coach at St. Pius X High School in Houston, Texas, leading his team to a 10–3 record and a state runner-up finish in 1998.

Entering the collegiate level, Faucette became an assistant strength & conditioning coach at Texas in 1999. He left for Southern Methodist University after two seasons to become the Mustangs' head strength & conditioning coach. Faucette returned to the Longhorns for a second stint in 2006–07. In 2008, he was hired by the St. Louis Rams as strength and conditioning coach. In June 2008, Faucette received the highest honor from the Collegiate Strength and Conditioning Coaches association (CSCCa) as he was named Master Strength and Conditioning coach. On February 5, he was retained by new Rams head coach Steve Spagnuolo.  On January 7, 2010, Coach Spagnuolo elected not to renew his contract  He was the head coach from 2010 to 2016 at Lutheran High School South in St. Louis.  On February 26, 2016, out of a candidate pool of over 150 coaches, Bishop Lynch High School in Dallas, Texas named Faucette as its Head Football Coach. In his first season, Faucette led Bishop Lynch to the 2016 TAPPS Division I state championship, the school's first football state title since 2003.

Faucette was originally drafted in the 12th round (290th pick) out of high school to play baseball for the Toronto Blue Jays. In 1981, at 17, he played outfield for their rookie-league team in Bradenton, Florida. In 1982, he played in Florence, South Carolina and Medicine Hat, Alberta before going to play college football for the University of Maryland. His daughter, Juliann, is a Professional volleyball player, attended the University of Texas, and was a three time All-America. His brother Patrick Faucette is an actor.

References

1963 births
Living people
American strength and conditioning coaches
American football linebackers
Maryland Terrapins football players
Texas Longhorns football coaches
SMU Mustangs football coaches
St. Louis Rams coaches
People from Levittown, Pennsylvania
People from Willingboro Township, New Jersey
Players of American football from New Jersey
Players of American football from Pennsylvania
Sportspeople from Burlington County, New Jersey
Willingboro High School alumni